Neoscona pratensis is a species of orb weaver in the spider family Araneidae. It is found in the United States and Canada.

References

External links

 

pratensis
Articles created by Qbugbot
Spiders described in 1847